Hale County is a county located in the west central portion of the U.S. state of Alabama. As of the 2020 census, the population was 14,785. Its county seat is Greensboro. It is named in honor of Confederate officer Stephen Fowler Hale.

Hale County is part of the Tuscaloosa, AL Metropolitan Statistical Area.

History

Hale County was established following the end of the American Civil War, on January 30, 1867.  Located in the west-central section of the state, it was created from portions of Greene, Marengo, Perry, and Tuscaloosa counties.  The vast majority of the territory came from Greene County.  The first American settlers in this area had been southerners migrating from Georgia, Tennessee, Kentucky, and the Carolinas.

Hale County is connected to three major twentieth-century artists: Walker Evans photographed the area in 1936 while he collaborated with James Agee on the 1941 book Let Us Now Praise Famous Men. Since the 1960s, artist William Christenberry, born in Tuscaloosa, has been photographing various structures in Hale County as part of his multi-media artistic investigations. More recently, Hale County has become the home of the nationally recognized Auburn University Rural Studio, an architectural outreach program founded by architect and artist Samuel Mockbee and D. K. Ruth.  It is also the birthplace of Eugene Sawyer, the second African American mayor of Chicago. In 2019 the film Hale County This Morning, This Evening  by artist RaMell Ross was nominated for an Academy Award for Best Documentary Feature, poetically addressing the region's shift in demographics and the power of intra-community authorship.

Since the American Civil War, whites have controlled much of the economic and political power in Hale County, enforced early by violence and later by the decades of disenfranchisement of black voters and statewide imposition of Jim Crow. In the first half of the 20th century, many African Americans left the county in two waves of migration to cities and northern and western industrial centers. Beginning in the late 1960s, they recovered the ability to vote.

In 1997, after a highly contested mayoral election, the city of Greensboro elected its first black mayor, John E. Owens Jr. Claude Hamilton, the first African-American chief of police, was appointed in 2000. In 2006, black and white county residents joined in electing the first black county sheriff, Kenneth W. Ellis, who was formerly the Moundville police chief.

Hale County has suffered economic decline, particularly in the southern more rural end of the county. Many manufacturing plants closed during late 20th century restructuring, and population and businesses declined with the loss of jobs, especially in and around Greensboro (the county seat).  The northern portion of the county, however, has enjoyed population and industrial growth due to its proximity to Tuscaloosa County. The latter has been a growing center of industry and new businesses, anchored by the University of Alabama and its large student body and resources.

Geography

Adjacent counties
Tuscaloosa County (north)
Bibb County (northeast)
Perry County (southeast)
Marengo County (south)
Greene County (west)

National protected area
 Talladega National Forest (part)

Demographics

2020 census

As of the 2020 United States census, there were 14,785 people, 5,650 households, and 3,611 families residing in the county.

2010 census
As of the 2010 United States census, there were 15,760 people living in the county. 59.0% were Black or African American, 39.8% White, 0.2% Asian, 0.2% Native American, 0.3% of some other race and 0.6% of two or more races. 0.9% were Hispanic or Latino (of any race).

2000 census
As of the census of 2000, there were 17,185 people, 6,415 households, and 4,605 families living in the county.  The population density was 27 people per square mile (10/km2).  There were 7,756 housing units at an average density of 12 per square mile (5/km2).  The racial makeup of the county was 39.83% White, 58.95% Black or African American, 0.17% Native American, 0.16% Asian, 0.02% Pacific Islander, 0.29% from other races, and 0.58% from two or more races.  0.91% of the population were Hispanic or Latino of any race.

There were 6,415 households, out of which 36.50% had children under the age of 18 living with them, 45.60% were married couples living together, 22.00% had a female householder with no husband present, and 28.20% were non-families. 26.40% of all households were made up of individuals, and 10.90% had someone living alone who was 65 years of age or older.  The average household size was 2.63 and the average family size was 3.19.

In the county, the population was spread out, with 29.60% under the age of 18, 9.10% from 18 to 24, 26.70% from 25 to 44, 21.10% from 45 to 64, and 13.50% who were 65 years of age or older.  The median age was 34 years. For every 100 females, there were 89.40 males.  For every 100 females age 18 and over, there were 83.60 males.

The median income for a household in the county was $25,807, and the median income for a family was $31,875. Males had a median income of $28,493 versus $19,363 for females. The per capita income for the county was $12,661.  About 22.20% of families and 26.90% of the population were below the poverty line, including 34.00% of those under age 18 and 26.70% of those age 65 or over.

Government and infrastructure

Hale County is reliably Democratic at the presidential level. The last Republican to win the county in a presidential election is Richard Nixon, who won it by a majority in 1972.

Transportation

Major highways
 U.S. Highway 80
 State Route 14
 State Route 25
 State Route 60
 State Route 61
 State Route 69

Airports
 Greensboro Municipal Airport (7A0) in Greensboro
 Moundville Airport (L44) in Moundville

Tourism
Greensboro, the county seat, is home to the 'Safe House Museum'.  On March 21, 1968, Martin Luther King Jr. attended a meeting at Greensboro's St. Matthew Church, and then spent the night in this house where he sought refuge from the Ku Klux Klan.  The museum reveals the struggle for equality for African Americans in Alabama, and its curator, Ms. Theresa Burroughs, was both a family friend of King, and a foot soldier in the Civil Rights Movement. Historically William Burns Paterson had set up Tullibody Academy for African Americans in Greensboro.

Greensboro is also home to a large number of antebellum-era houses and churches, including some that are listed on the National Register of Historic Places such as Glencairn and Magnolia Grove.

Communities

City
Greensboro (county seat)

Towns
Akron
Moundville (partly in Tuscaloosa County)
Newbern

Unincorporated communities
Darrah
Gallion
Havana
Lock Five
Prairieville
Sawyerville
Stewart
Wedgeworth

Ghost towns
Arcola
Erie
Freetown

Notable people
 William Christenberry (1936-2016), artist and photographer, born in Hale County

See also
National Register of Historic Places listings in Hale County, Alabama
Properties on the Alabama Register of Landmarks and Heritage in Hale County, Alabama
Hale County This Morning, This Evening—2018 documentary film about the black community in Hale County

References

External links
Moundville Archaeological Park, Hale County, AL
William Christenberry: Place, Time, and Memory Southern Spaces September 28, 2007
Official website of Hale County

 
Tuscaloosa, Alabama metropolitan area
1867 establishments in Alabama
Counties of Appalachia
Populated places established in 1867
Black Belt (U.S. region)
Majority-minority counties in Alabama